Jordan is an unincorporated community in Bastrop County, Texas, United States.

Schools
Jordan is served by the Bastrop Independent School District.

References

Unincorporated communities in Bastrop County, Texas
Unincorporated communities in Texas